Sutphin is a surname almost exclusively found in the United States. It is an Americanized form of the Dutch surname Zutphen or van Zutphen, from the place-name Zutphen (used for residents), meaning "south fen".

Notable persons with the name include:
 Dudley Sutphin (1875–1926), American lawyer and tennis player
 William H. Sutphin (1887–1970), American politician
  Beverly Sutphin, character in John Waters' 1994 film Serial Mom

See also
 Sutphin Boulevard, in the New York City borough of Queens
 Sutphen (surname)

References

Americanized surnames
Dutch-language surnames
Zutphen